Egyptian-Slovenian relations are foreign relations between Egypt and Slovenia. Since September 2007, Egypt has an embassy in Ljubljana.  Slovenia has an embassy in Cairo (opened in 1993).  Both countries are members of the Union for the Mediterranean.

In the late 19th and early 20th century significant number of Slovenian women known as Aleksandrinke were sent to Egypt to work as housemaids and nannies.

Diplomatic visits
In June 1999, Slovene Prime Minister Janez Drnovsek met Egyptian Prime Minister Kamal al-Janzuri in Cairo. They discussed means of boosting bilateral cooperation in the various domains especially the economic one.

In May 2007, Slovene Transport Minister Janez Bozic met his Egyptian counterpart Mohamed Mansour in Cairo. Their talks focused on boosting transport ties between the Egyptian port of Alexandria and the Slovenian port of Koper. Bozic said there was greater demand for the shipment of perishable goods, such as fruit and vegetables.

Agreements
In 1997, the two countries signed a trade agreement.

See also
 Foreign relations of Egypt
 Foreign relations of Slovenia
 Egypt–Yugoslavia relations
 Yugoslavia and the Non-Aligned Movement
 Yugoslavia and the Organisation of African Unity

References

External links
  Slovenian embassy in Cairo

 
 
Slovenia
Egypt